The Daily Meal is a food and drinks website. It is the first site launched by Spanfeller Media Group. Jim Spanfeller is a former CEO of Forbes.com. In 2016, Spanfeller was acquired by Tribune Publishing.

Content
The Daily Meal produces original content and videos from editors, industry insiders, and the user community. The website features nine channels (Cook, Eat/Dine, Drink, Travel, Entertain, Best Recipes, Holidays, Lists and Community) and 24 city pages (Atlanta, Austin, Boston, Charleston, Chicago, Denver, Houston, Kansas City, Las Vegas, Los Angeles, Miami, Nashville, New Orleans, New York, Philadelphia, Portland, San Diego, San Francisco, Seattle, St. Louis, Toronto, Twin Cities, Vancouver, and Washington D.C.).  Visitors to the site can upload their own stories and recipes through the community channel. The Daily Meal also produces annual reports, including: the 50 Most Powerful People in Food, 25 Best Craft Breweries in America, 101 Best Restaurants in America and 150 Best Bars in America.  The content published on The Daily Meal is available to the general public free of charge.

History and growth
The Daily Meal was launched in January 2011 by Spanfeller Media Group, a venture backed Web-based content company led by Jim Spanfeller. The Daily Meal provides both original content and that which is aggregated from various contributors and media partners.  The website draws over 8 million unique visitors per month, according to Google Analytics, and ranks as one of the fastest-growing content sites of all time.

In February 2012, the site unveiled a new homepage design and launched The Daily Meal Video Network, a video platform fully owned and operated by The Daily Meal. The Video Network is available across the site’s multiple channels and offers features including step-by-step recipe guides; behind-the-scenes looks into trendy eateries; and discussions with top chefs and culinary stars.
The Daily Meal launched The World of Wine in July 2013, one of the largest resources for wine lovers available on the web. Covering more than 60,000 wines, the special section merges thorough descriptions of the world's wine regions and grape varieties, with tips on wine–food pairings, recipe ideas, winemaker's notes, and suggestions for similar wines.

Editorial staff
The Daily Meal is under the editorial direction of Colman Andrews, a co-founder and former editor-in-chief of Saveur magazine. Andrews is also a recipient of eight James Beard Awards and the author of numerous cookbooks. His most recent work for Chronicle, The Country Cooking of Italy, was named International Cookbook and Cookbook of the Year by the James Beard Foundation in 2010. Colman has been a regular guest chef on NBC's Today Show, and has appeared on Good Morning America, several PBS programs, the Food Network, the Lifetime Channel, the Discovery Channel, and numerous regional cable and morning talk shows. 

The Daily Meal has an editorial team of 15, based in the Financial District of New York, as well as contributors nationwide.

See also
 List of websites about food and drink

References

Further reading
 Adweek, August 5, 2013, The Daily Meal Installs JP Kyrillos as President; New test kitchen aimed at boosting site's original video
 TIME, August 4, 2013, You’ll Never Guess Where the Nation’s Best Craft Beer Is Brewed
 TODAY, July 3, 2013, Healthier swaps to sugar-filled coffee drinks
 Reuters, May 16, 2013, Taiwan dumpling eatery tops 101 Best Asian Restaurants poll
 New York Daily News, June 20, 2013, The Daily Meal ranks America's best burgers from chain restaurants
 Philadelphia Inquirer, April 4, 2013, Philly coffee shop ranked #1 in America
 Bloomberg, February 20, 2013, French Laundry Tops Ranking of Best Restaurants in U.S.
 FOLIO, August 21, 2013, How The Daily Meal Got 5 Million Uniques in 19 Months
 eMediaVitals, February 29, 2012, 5 Site Redesigns That Pack a Punch
 MediaPost, February 16, 2012, SMG Serves Video With Daily Meal
 Min Online, January 19, 2011, Daily Meal’s 50 Most Powerful People in Food
 Min Online, November 23, 2010, Yum! Food Brands Partner Up
 Eater, National, September 22, 2010, The Daily Meal Acquires Always Hungry, Hires Jeff Zalaznick
 PaidContent, September 15, 2010, Spanfeller Media Group Gets Ready to Unveil The Daily Meal
 Business Insider, November 9, 2010, 6 Hottest Journalism Startups of 2010

External links
 The Daily Meal

Websites about food and drink
Internet properties established in 2011
Tribune Publishing
2011 establishments in the United States